The Women's 500 m time trial at the 2011 UCI Track Cycling World Championships was held on March 23. 13 athletes participated in the contest.

Results
The race was held at 19:00.

See also
2011 UCI Para-cycling Track World Championships – Women's time trial
2011 UCI Track Cycling World Championships

References

2011 UCI Track Cycling World Championships
UCI Track Cycling World Championships – Women's 500 m time trial